Charles Upton (born December 13, 1948) is an American poet and esotericist.

Life
Born in San Francisco, Charles Upton grew up in Marin County, California.  He attended Catholic schools through high school. He attended UC Davis for  four days.

Career
In San Francisco, he met the poet Lew Welch, who became his mentor. Although much younger than most of the Beat poets, Upton's first two volumes of poetry were also published by City Lights.  It was associated with many of the earlier Beat poets.

After his first two volumes of poems were published, Upton became involved with the Sanctuary Movement for Central American refugees. He produced and distributed a video, Through the Needle’s Eye, containing testimonies of refugees.

In the late 1980s he was briefly involved with the "magical populism" of the New Age peace movement.  He studied group dreamwork and dream networking.

In 1988 he joined a traditional Sufi order.  Under his wife's influence, Upton became interested in the metaphysics of the Traditionalist or Perennialist School (the followers of Rene Guenon, Ananda Coomaraswamy and Frithjof Schuon).  He continues to be identified with this school.

His papers are held at University of Connecticut.

Activism
In 2013 Charles Upton conceived of The Covenants Initiative, based on the book The Covenants of the Prophet Muhammad with the Christians of the    
World by his colleague Dr. John Andrew Morrow. The Covenants Initiative urges Muslims to abide by the covenants concluded between Muhammad and the Christian communities of his time: http://www.covenantsoftheprophet.com. In November, 2018, The Covenants of the Prophet Muhammad with the Christians of the World was cited at length by the Supreme Court of Pakistan in their decision to acquit the Christian woman Asia Bibi on charges of blasphemy.

Marriage and family
He married Jennifer Doane.  After living in Marin County, California, they currently live in Lexington, Kentucky.

Works
 Panic Grass (epic poem) City Lights Books, 1968; ASIN B001FSYIPE
 Time Raid, (poems) Four Seasons Foundation, 1968; ASIN B0006BVUOS
 Doorkeeper of the Heart, Versions of Rabi’a (poems), Threshold Books, 1988; Pir Press, 2004; 
 Hammering Hot Iron: A Spiritual Critique of Bly’s Iron John (metaphysics and social criticism), Quest Books, 1993; Sophia Perennis 2005; 
 The System of Antichrist: Truth and Falsehood in Postmodernism and the New Age (metaphysics and social criticism), Sophia Perennis, 2001; 
 Legends of the End: Prophesies of the End Times, Antichrist, Apocalypse, and Messiah from Eight Religious Traditions, Sophia Perennis, 2005; 
 Cracks in the Great Wall: UFOs and Traditional Metaphysics, Sophia Perennis, 2005; 
 The Virtues of the Prophet: A Young Muslim's Guide to the Greater Jihad, the War Against the Passions, Sophia Perennis, 2006; 
 Knowings, in the Arts of Metaphysics, Cosmology and the Spiritual Path, Sophia Perennis, 2008; 
 Reflections of Tasawwuf: Essays, Poems and Narrative on Sufi Themes, Sophia Perennis, 2008; 
 Who Is the Earth? How to See God in the Natural World, Sophia Perennis, 2008; 
 Folk Metaphysics: Mystical Meanings in Traditional Folk Songs and Spirituals, Sophia Perennis, 2008 
 Shadow of the Rose: The Esoterism of the Romantic Tradition (with his wife Jennifer Doane Upton), Sophia Perennis, 2008; 
 Findings in Metaphysic, Path and Lore, With a Response to the Traditionalist/Perennialist School, Sophia Perennis, 2010; 
 The Science of the Greater Jihad: Essays in Principal Psychology, Sophia Perennis, 2011; 
 The Wars of Love and Other Poems, with "A Reader's Guide to The Wars of Love" and "Lew Welch as Teacher", Sophia Perennis, 2011; 
 Vectors of the Counter-Initiation: The Course and Destiny of Inverted Spirituality, Sophia Perennis, 2012; 
 Day and Night on the Sufi Path, Sophia Perennis, 2015; 
 The Words of God to Prophet Muhammad: Forty Sacred Sayings, 2015; 
 What Poets Used to Know: Poetics, Mythopoesis, Metaphysics, Angelico Press/Sophia Perennis, 2016; 
 Dugin against Dugin: A Traditionalist Critique of the Fourth Political Theory, Reviviscimus, 2018;  
 The Alien Disclosure Deception: The Metaphysics of Social Engineering, Sophia Perennis, 2021; 
 The Way Forward for Perennialism, After the Antinomianism of Frithjof Schuon, Sophia Perennis, 2022;

Editor
 Because You Talk: An Anthology of Bay Area Poets ed. Charles Upton, Robert Starfire, Hans Steinkellner, Other Voices Literary Society, 1976; 
 Dark Way to Paradise: Dante's Inferno in Light of the Spiritual Path,Jennifer Doane Upton, Sophia Perennis, 2005;  
 False Dawn: The United Religions Initiative, Globalism and the Quest for a One-World Religion, Lee Penn, Sophia Perennis, 2005; 
 The Ordeal of Mercy: Dante's Purgatorio in Light of the Spiritual Path, Jennifer Doane Upton, Angelico Press/Sophia Perennis, 2015;

Anthologies
 Because You Talk: An Anthology of Bay Area Poets ed. Charles Upton, Robert Starfire, Hans Steinkellner, Other Voices Literary Society, 1976; 
 Mark in Time, Glide Publications, 1971; 
 Excerpt from Panic Grass in City Lights Pocket Poets Anthology, Lawrence Ferlinghetti (ed.), City Lights Books, 1995; 
 Diamond Cutters: Visionary Poets in America, Britain and Oceania, Andrew Harvey and Jay Ramsay (ed.), Tayen Lane Publications, 2016; ISNB (trade hardcover) 978-1-944505-22-0, ISBN (trade softcover)978-1-944505-37-0

References

External links
 Charles Upton's website
 Charles Upton's YouTube channel

1948 births
American spiritual writers
American occult writers
21st-century American poets
American male poets
20th-century American poets
Writers from San Francisco
Converts to Islam
American Sufis
Traditionalist School
Metaphysicians
Poets from California
Living people
20th-century American male writers
21st-century American male writers
20th-century American non-fiction writers
21st-century American non-fiction writers
American male non-fiction writers